Chinese Taipei sent a delegation to compete at the  2012 Summer Paralympics in London. The team was composed of 18 competitors.

Medalists

Archery 

Records tumbled as Tseng Lung Hui got 650 points in the ranking round of Ind. recurve W1/W2, renewing the Paralympic record held by Korea's LEE Myeong-Gu, who ended up 6th place this year.  Later on, Tseng claimed his second bronze medal at the end of the knockout stage.  He attained his first Paralympic bronze medal at the Beijing Paralympics.

Men

|-
|align=left|Hua Chen Chung
|align=left rowspan="2"|Ind. recurve W1/W2
|537
|23
|align=center| (10)L 2-6
|colspan=5|did not advance
|-
|align=left|Tseng Lung Hui
|650 
|1
|
| (17)W 6-2
| (9)W 6-4
| (4)L 3-7
|Bronze Medal Match (2) W 7-3
|
|-
|align=left|Ching Jen Yang
|align=left|Ind. recurve standing
|581
|20
|align=center| (13)L 5-6
|colspan=5|did not advance
|-
|align=left|Hua Chen ChungLung Hui TsengChing Jen Yang
|align=left|Team recurve
|1768
|8
|
|align=center| (9)W 194-183
|align=center| (1)L 179-195
|colspan=3|did not advance
|}

Athletics 

Men’s Field Events

Women’s Track and Road Events

Women’s Field Events
The 2012 Summer Paralympics is the first ever Paralympic Games to include javelin throw competition for visually-impaired women.  In this event, even though Chinese Taipei's Liu Ya-Ting finishes 5th, she still holds the Paralympic record of F13, given that the top four players are all F12 athletes.

Judo

Powerlifting 

Two-time winner of the women's −75 kg weight class, powerlifter Lin Tzu-Hui aimed to claim her third Paralympic gold, but proved in vain.  With potent competitors from China and Nigeria both breaking the records in their additional attempts, Lin failed to overcome the record she set for herself － 137.5 kg.  She ended up as the bronze medalist with her first attempt, a lift of 137 kg.

Women

Shooting

Swimming 

Women

Table tennis 

Men

Women

Runners-up at the 2004 Paralympics and bronze medalists at the 2000 Games, Hsiao Shu-Chin and Wei Mei-Hui participated in the Women's Team C4-5 games for the third time.  They were seeded number 8 this year and had to start from the first round, where they lost 2-3 to their Italian opponents and came in last in the tournament.  Wei was also a bronze medalist in the Women's Individual C5 event at the 2004 Paralympics.

See also
Chinese Taipei at the 2012 Summer Olympics

References

Nations at the 2012 Summer Paralympics
2012
Paralympics